The Puerto Rico Ice Hockey Association, abbreviated as PRIHA, is the governing body that oversees ice and inline hockey in Puerto Rico.

History
The Puerto Rico Ice Hockey Association was founded in 2020, and was later accepted into the International Ice Hockey Federation (IIHF) on 29 September 2022 as an associate member. The organization is also part of the Puerto Rico Olympic Committee. Puerto Rico became the first territory of the United States in the Caribbean and the sixth Latin American nation to join the IIHF. The current president of PRIHA is Scott Vargas.

There are currently no operational indoor rinks in Puerto Rico. The Aguadilla Ice Skating Arena, the only rink in the territory, has been closed since 2017 due to damage caused by Hurricane Maria.

Ice hockey statistics
 205 players total
 123 male players
 44 junior players
 38 female players
 No referees
 Currently no IIHF standard rinks
 Currently not ranked in the IIHF World Ranking

National teams
 Men's national team
 Men's U20 national team
 Women's national team

Participation by year
2022

Puerto Rico was not a member of the IIHF and therefore not eligible to enter any IIHF World Championship tournaments.

References

External links
 IIHF profile
 Official website of the Puerto Rico Ice Hockey Association

Ice hockey in Puerto Rico
International Ice Hockey Federation members
Ice hockey